Mararanjani (pronounced māraranjani) is a rāgam in Carnatic music (musical scale of South Indian classical music). It is the 25th Melakarta rāgam in the 72 melakarta rāgam system of Carnatic music. It is called Sharāvati in Muthuswami Dikshitar school of Carnatic music.

Structure and Lakshana 

It is the 1st rāgam in the 5th chakra Bana. The mnemonic name is Bana-Pa. The mnemonic phrase is sa ri gu ma pa dha na. Its  structure (ascending and descending scale) is as follows (see swaras in Carnatic music for details on below notation and terms):
: 
: 
(the notes in this scale are chathusruthi rishabham, antara gandharam, shuddha madhyamam, shuddha dhaivatham, shuddha nishadham)

As it is a melakarta rāgam, by definition it is a sampoorna rāgam (has all seven notes in ascending and descending scale). It is the shuddha madhyamam equivalent of Kantamani, which is the 61st melakarta.

Janya rāgams 
Mararanjani has a few minor janya rāgams (derived scales) associated with it, of which Janasammodini is one of the better known rāgams. See List of janya rāgams for all rāgams associated with this scale.

Compositions 
A few compositions set to Mararanjani are:

Manasa srirama by Thyagaraja
Sharavati by Muthuswami Dikshitar
Ramapathina by Dr. M. Balamuralikrishna

Related rāgams 
This section covers the theoretical and scientific aspect of this rāgam.

Mararanjani's notes when shifted using Graha bhedam, yields Vanaspati, a minor melakarta rāgam. Graha bhedam is the step taken in keeping the relative note frequencies same, while shifting the shadjam to the next note in the rāgam. For further details and an illustration refer Graha bhedam on Vanaspati.

Notes

References

Melakarta ragas